Marina Carrier (born 1996)  is an Australian Modern Pentathlon competitor and Olympian.   

Carrier represented Australia at the 2020 Summer Olympics, Tokyo, in the modern pentathlon. Notably, she came third in the riding (show jumping) event with a clear round, and came 27th overall despite setbacks due to injury in the months leading into the Games,.

References 

1996 births
Living people
Australian pentathletes
Australian female modern pentathletes
Olympic modern pentathletes of Australia
Modern pentathletes at the 2014 Summer Youth Olympics
Modern pentathletes at the 2020 Summer Olympics
20th-century Australian women
21st-century Australian women